Bhinneka Tunggal Ika is an Indonesian national song that was created by Binsar Sitompul and A. Thalib.

Lyrics and structure

"Bhinneka Tunggal Ika" is performed Maestoso in  time.

Indonesian songs
Indonesian patriotic songs
Year of song missing